The 2004 Nevada Wolf Pack football team represented the University of Nevada, Reno during the 2004 NCAA Division I-A football season. Nevada competed as a member of the Western Athletic Conference (WAC). The Wolf Pack were led by Chris Ault in his 20th overall and 1st straight season since taking over as head coach for the third time. They played their home games at Mackay Stadium.

Schedule

Game summaries

at Louisiana Tech

Sacramento State

Buffalo

at San Diego State

at UNLV

at Hawaii

Rice

Tulsa

San Jose State

at SMU

at Fresno State

Boise State

References

Nevada
Nevada Wolf Pack football seasons
Nevada Wolf Pack football